Joseph Enoch Smith (1889 – 13 November 1916) was an English professional footballer who played in the Football League for Birmingham. He played as a half back. He was killed in action in the First World War.

Football career 
Smith was born in Kilnhurst, Yorkshire. A coal miner by trade, he began his football career with his works team, Hickleton Main Colliery, before joining Birmingham in 1912. He made his debut in the Second Division on 4 January 1913, deputising for James Bumphrey in an away game against Wolverhampton Wanderers which finished 2–2. A defensive player, described as one who "held his opponents in check effectively, but should show more discretion putting the ball forward", he was unable to impose himself on the first team, and after two seasons in which he played only eight games, he joined Chesterfield Town. Smith spent the 1914–15 season at the Midland League club, scoring once from 30 league games, before competitive football was suspended for the duration of the First World War.

War service 
Smith served in the 17th Battalion, Middlesex Regiment – the so-called "Footballers' Battalion" – in northern France. He rose to the rank of Company Serjeant Major, and was killed at Serre, Pas-de-Calais, on 13 November 1916 near the end of the Battle of the Somme. Smith was mentioned in despatches for displaying considerable bravery, "after being wounded, again dashed into battle, only to be shot down", and is commemorated at Serre Road Cemetery No. 1.

References

External links 
 Smith's details at the Commonwealth War Graves Commission

1889 births
1916 deaths
People from Kilnhurst
English footballers
Association football midfielders
Hickleton Main F.C. players
Birmingham City F.C. players
Chesterfield F.C. players
English Football League players
British Army personnel of World War I
Middlesex Regiment soldiers
Date of birth missing
Footballers from Yorkshire
British military personnel killed in the Battle of the Somme
Military personnel from Yorkshire